Unborde (アンボルデ anborude; stylized as unBORDE) is a Japanese record label established on December 21, 2010 as a sublabel of Warner Music Japan. The label is currently led by Ryoma Suzuki, Rip Slyme's producer.

Current roster
As of June 2022:
 Aimyon
 chelmico
 Genie High
 Shinsei Kamattechan
 Yu Takahashi
 Team Shachi
 Suda Keina
 Tempalay
 tofubeats
 Wanima

Former artists
 Akasick (2015-2017)
 Androp (2010-2016)
 Natsuko Kondo (2010-2012)
 Anri Kumaki (2011-2012)
 Band Janaimon (2015-2017)
 Q;Indivi+ (2010)
 The Beatmoss (2012-2013)
 The Privates (2014)
 Passepied (2012-2016)
 Dadaray (2017-2018)
 Rip Slyme (2010-2018)
 Tensai Band (2015-2017)
 Livetune (2016)
 Gesu no Kiwami Otome (2014-2018)
 Indigo la End (2014-2018)
 Kyary Pamyu Pamyu (2011-2019)
 Yonige (2017-2020)
 Roe (2018-2021)
 Hakubi (2020-2021)
 Capsule (2013-2021)
Yasutaka Nakata (2016-2021)

Unborde All Stars (2016)

Lineup
 Akasick
 Androp
 Capsule
 Gesu no Kiwame Otome
 Indigo La End
 Kyary Pamyu Pamyu
 Passepied
 Shinsei Kamattechan
 Rip Slyme
 Team Shachi
 Tofubeats
 Yu Takahashi

Discography
Compilation albums
 Feel + Unborde Greatest Hits (March 9, 2016)

Concerts
 Coca-Cola presents unBORDE 5th Anniversary Fes 2016 (April 10, 2016, Makuhari Messe)

See also
Warner Music Group

References

External links
 
  (Verified)

Japanese record labels
Record labels established in 2010
Labels distributed by Warner Music Group